Valiarian Biezhanovich Khuroshvili (also Valeryan Khuroshvili, ; born April 4, 1979) is a Belarusian former swimmer of Georgian heritage, who specialized in middle-distance freestyle events.

Career

Khuroshvili competed for Belarus in the men's 4 × 200 m freestyle relay at the 2000 Summer Olympics in Sydney. Teaming with Igor Koleda, Dmitry Koptur, and Pavel Lagoun in heat one, Khuroshvili anchored the longest relay race with a split of 1:51.42, but the Belarusians missed the top 8 final by 1.25 seconds with a sixth-place effort and twelfth overall in a final time of 7:24.83.

References

1979 births
Living people
Belarusian male freestyle swimmers
Olympic swimmers of Belarus
Swimmers at the 2000 Summer Olympics
People from Mogilev
Belarusian people of Georgian descent
Sportspeople from Mogilev Region